The Sovetsky constituency (No.7) was a Russian legislative constituency in Bashkortostan. The constituency was based in central Bashkiria, centred on Tuymazy. Currently the territory of former constituency is split between Ufa, Neftekamsk and Sterlitamak constituencies.

Members elected

Election results

1993

|-
! colspan=2 style="background-color:#E9E9E9;text-align:left;vertical-align:top;" |Candidate
! style="background-color:#E9E9E9;text-align:left;vertical-align:top;" |Party
! style="background-color:#E9E9E9;text-align:right;" |Votes
! style="background-color:#E9E9E9;text-align:right;" |%
|-
|style="background-color:"|
|align=left|Zifkat Sayetgaliyev
|align=left|Independent
|
|37.38%
|-
|style="background-color:"|
|align=left|Vladimir Merzlyakov
|align=left|Independent
| -
|18.16%
|-
| colspan="5" style="background-color:#E9E9E9;"|
|- style="font-weight:bold"
| colspan="3" style="text-align:left;" | Total
| 
| 100%
|-
| colspan="5" style="background-color:#E9E9E9;"|
|- style="font-weight:bold"
| colspan="4" |Source:
|
|}

1995

|-
! colspan=2 style="background-color:#E9E9E9;text-align:left;vertical-align:top;" |Candidate
! style="background-color:#E9E9E9;text-align:left;vertical-align:top;" |Party
! style="background-color:#E9E9E9;text-align:right;" |Votes
! style="background-color:#E9E9E9;text-align:right;" |%
|-
|style="background-color:"|
|align=left|Zifkat Sayetgaliyev (incumbent)
|align=left|Agrarian Party
|
|59.49%
|-
|style="background-color:"|
|align=left|Lena Vakhitova
|align=left|Power to the People
|
|11.33%
|-
|style="background-color:#1A1A1A"|
|align=left|Rafis Kadyrov
|align=left|Stanislav Govorukhin Bloc
|
|6.72%
|-
|style="background-color:"|
|align=left|Sergey Dergunov
|align=left|Liberal Democratic Party
|
|5.56%
|-
|style="background-color:#2998D5"|
|align=left|Azat Idiatullin
|align=left|Russian All-People's Movement
|
|3.55%
|-
|style="background-color:"|
|align=left|Boris Minigulov
|align=left|Union of Muslims
|
|2.38%
|-
|style="background-color:#3C3E42"|
|align=left|Albert Akhmetov
|align=left|Duma-96
|
|1.45%
|-
|style="background-color:#000000"|
|colspan=2 |against all
|
|8.16%
|-
| colspan="5" style="background-color:#E9E9E9;"|
|- style="font-weight:bold"
| colspan="3" style="text-align:left;" | Total
| 
| 100%
|-
| colspan="5" style="background-color:#E9E9E9;"|
|- style="font-weight:bold"
| colspan="4" |Source:
|
|}

1999

|-
! colspan=2 style="background-color:#E9E9E9;text-align:left;vertical-align:top;" |Candidate
! style="background-color:#E9E9E9;text-align:left;vertical-align:top;" |Party
! style="background-color:#E9E9E9;text-align:right;" |Votes
! style="background-color:#E9E9E9;text-align:right;" |%
|-
|style="background-color:#3B9EDF"|
|align=left|Franis Saifullin
|align=left|Fatherland – All Russia
|
|54.56%
|-
|style="background-color:"|
|align=left|Aleksandr Ovsyannikov
|align=left|Communist Party
|
|18.05%
|-
|style="background-color:"|
|align=left|Vladimir Bogdanov
|align=left|Independent
|
|10.58%
|-
|style="background-color:"|
|align=left|Zagir Khakimov
|align=left|Yabloko
|
|5.47%
|-
|style="background-color:"|
|align=left|Ramil Baitimirov
|align=left|Our Home – Russia
|
|3.40%
|-
|style="background-color:#000000"|
|colspan=2 |against all
|
|6.03%
|-
| colspan="5" style="background-color:#E9E9E9;"|
|- style="font-weight:bold"
| colspan="3" style="text-align:left;" | Total
| 
| 100%
|-
| colspan="5" style="background-color:#E9E9E9;"|
|- style="font-weight:bold"
| colspan="4" |Source:
|
|}

2003

|-
! colspan=2 style="background-color:#E9E9E9;text-align:left;vertical-align:top;" |Candidate
! style="background-color:#E9E9E9;text-align:left;vertical-align:top;" |Party
! style="background-color:#E9E9E9;text-align:right;" |Votes
! style="background-color:#E9E9E9;text-align:right;" |%
|-
|style="background-color:"|
|align=left|Vener Kamaletdinov
|align=left|United Russia
|
|24.44%
|-
|style="background-color:"|
|align=left|Lilia Muratova
|align=left|Independent
|
|19.35%
|-
|style="background-color:"|
|align=left|Sergey Kuznetsov
|align=left|Yabloko
|
|10.30%
|-
|style="background-color:"|
|align=left|Aleksandr Ovsyannikov
|align=left|Communist Party
|
|9.76%
|-
|style="background-color:"|
|align=left|Askar Fazlyyev
|align=left|Independent
|
|5.33%
|-
|style="background-color:#7C73CC"|
|align=left|Zagir Khakimov
|align=left|Great Russia – Eurasian Union
|
|4.70%
|-
|style="background-color:"|
|align=left|Vladimir Parkhomenko
|align=left|Independent
|
|3.57%
|-
|style="background-color:"|
|align=left|Zilya Shangareyeva
|align=left|Independent
|
|2.68%
|-
|style="background-color:"|
|align=left|Anver Yumagulov
|align=left|Independent
|
|1.89%
|-
|style="background-color:#164C8C"|
|align=left|Sergey Sibiryakov
|align=left|United Russian Party Rus'
|
|1.85%
|-
|style="background-color:"|
|align=left|Azamat Iskuzhin
|align=left|Independent
|
|1.45%
|-
|style="background-color:#000000"|
|colspan=2 |against all
|
|10.65%
|-
| colspan="5" style="background-color:#E9E9E9;"|
|- style="font-weight:bold"
| colspan="3" style="text-align:left;" | Total
| 
| 100%
|-
| colspan="5" style="background-color:#E9E9E9;"|
|- style="font-weight:bold"
| colspan="4" |Source:
|
|}

Notes

References 

Obsolete Russian legislative constituencies
Politics of Bashkortostan